Morris High School, in New York City, was a high school in the Melrose section of the Bronx borough's South Bronx area. The direct predecessor of Morris was built in 1897 and established as the Mixed High School, situated in a small brick building on 157th Street and 3rd Avenue, about six blocks south of where the new building would be built. It was the first high school built in the Bronx and was the first high school in the New York City public school system to enroll both male and female students. Originally named Peter Cooper High School, the name was changed to Morris High School to commemorate a famous Bronx landowner, Gouverneur Morris, one of the signers of the United States Constitution and credited as author of its Preamble.  Morris High School was one of the original New York City Public High Schools created by the New York City school reform act of 1896. On December 22, 1899, the Mixed High School was a founding member of the College Entrance Examination Board (CEEB), now known as the College Board. In 1983, the school and surrounding area was listed on the National Register of Historic Places as the Morris High School Historic District.

In 2002, as part of an overall restructuring and downsizing of New York City's high schools, Morris High School was closed. The building was renamed the Morris Campus. It now houses four small specialty high schools: High School for Violin and Dance, Bronx International High School, the School for Excellence, and the Morris Academy for Collaborative Studies.

Notable alumni

 Sydney Beck, (1906–2001), American musicologist, music educator, violinist and viol player. 
 Milton Berle, (1908–2002), American comedian and actor. Berle's career as an entertainer spanned over 80 years, 
 Bernard Botein (1900–1974), lawyer and presiding justice of the New York Supreme Court, Appellate Division, First Department, and president of the New York City Bar Association.
 Jack Coffey (1887–1966), Major League Baseball player who played for the Boston Doves, Detroit Tigers and Boston Red Sox
 Judith Crist (1922–2012), American film critic and academic. 
 Jules Dassin (1911–2008), American film director, producer, writer and actor.
 Anthony J. DePace (1892–1977), American architect who designed numerous Roman Catholic churches
 Chris Eubank (born 1966), British former professional boxer who held the WBO middleweight and super-middleweight titles.
 Fat Joe (born 1970), American Hip-Hop star, actor, businessman who set up his own label, Terror Squad (didn't graduate)
 Christian Filostrat (born 1945), American diplomat, recipient of the 1994 Presidential Award. 
 Judith Josephine Grossman (1923–1997), who took the pen-name Judith Merril about 1945, science fiction writer, editor, and political activist
 Armand Hammer (1898–1990), American business manager and owner, most closely associated with Occidental Petroleum, a company he ran.
 Vincent Harding (1931–2014), African-American historian and a scholar
 Frieda B. Hennock (1904–1960), first female commissioner of the Federal Communications Commission
 Julia Harrison (1920–2017), American politician who served as a Democratic member of the New York City Council 
 Peter Karter (1922–2010), American nuclear engineer and one of the pioneers of the modern recycling industry
 Allan Kwartler (1917–1998), American sabre and foil fencer. He was Pan-American sabre champion, 3-time Olympian.
 Maxim Lieber (1897–1993),  prominent American literary agent.
 Helen Marshall (1929–2017), American politician from New York City and Queens Borough President.
 Kay Medford (1919–1980), American actress.
 Hermann Joseph Muller (1890–1967), American geneticist, educator. 1946 Nobel Prize in Physiology or Medicine 
 Arthur Murray (1895–1991), American ballroom dancer and businessman,
 Frank A. Oliver (1883–1968), American lawyer and politician who served 6 terms as a U.S. Representative for New York.
 Bernard Opper (1915–2000), All-American basketball player for the Kentucky Wildcats and professional player
 Alex Faickney Osborn (1888–1966), American advertising executive and author 
 Colin Powell (1937–2021), American politician, statesman, diplomat, and United States Army officer who served as the 65th United States secretary of state 
 Gabe Pressman (1924–2017), American journalist, reporter for WNBC-TV in New York City for more than 60 years.
 Mae Questel (1908–1998), American actress. She was best known for providing the voices for the animated characters Betty Boop.
 Val Ramos (born 1958), a Nuevo Flamenco guitarist.
 John Herman Randall Jr. (1899–1980), philosopher, New Thought author, and educator
 Victor Riesel (1913–1995), American newspaper journalist and columnist 
 Benito Romano, (born 1950), first Puerto Rican to hold a United States Attorney's post in New York
 Romeo Santos, Bachata (born 1981),  American singer and songwriter, lead member and vocalist of the bachata group Aventura.
 Robert Scheer (born 1936), American journalist 
 Arthur Allan Seidelman, Emmy Award-winning film, television, and theater director and producer
Meyer Wolf Weisgal (1894–1977), journalist, publisher, and playwright; President of the Weizmann Institute of Science

References

1897 establishments in New York City
2002 disestablishments in New York (state)
Defunct high schools in the Bronx
Educational institutions disestablished in 2002
Educational institutions established in 1897
Morrisania, Bronx
New York City Department of Education
New York City Designated Landmarks in the Bronx
New York City interior landmarks
Public high schools in the Bronx